Ben Lien is a Minnesota politician and member of the Minnesota House of Representatives. A former member of the Minnesota Democratic–Farmer–Labor Party (DFL), he represented District 4A in northwestern Minnesota.

Early life and education
Lien grew up in Moorhead, Minnesota and graduated from Moorhead High School. He attended Minnesota State University Moorhead, graduating with a B.A. in political science.

Minnesota House of Representatives
Lien was first elected to the Minnesota House of Representatives in 2012. He was re-elected in 2014, 2016, and 2018. On January 30, 2020 he announced he would not seek re-election for a fifth term.

References

External links
Rep. Ben Lien official campaign website
https://ballotpedia.org/Ben_Lien

Living people
Members of the Minnesota House of Representatives
21st-century American politicians
Year of birth missing (living people)
Minnesota State University Moorhead alumni